Alunitdağ (also, Aunitdagh) is a village in the Dashkasan Rayon of Azerbaijan.  The village forms part of the municipality of Daşkəsən.

References 

World Gazetteer: Azerbaijan – World-Gazetteer.com

Populated places in Dashkasan District